Devil's Head or Devils Head may refer to:

Places
Devil's Head, a balancing rock at Chimney Rock State Park in  North Carolina, United States
Devils Head (summit), a summit in the Rampart Range of central Colorado, United States
Devil's Head Lookout, a U.S. Forest Service fire lookout tower at Devils Head summit
Devil's Head Resort, in Merrimac, Sauk County, Wisconsin
The Devil's Heads, or Čertovy hlavy, in situ rock sculptures by Václav Levý near Želízy in the Czech Republic 
Other
Echinocactus horizonthalonius, a cactus also known as "devil's head"
Hong Kong ten-cent coin, nicknamed the "devil's head" by residents of the southeastern provinces of China in the early 1990s
1954 Series (banknotes), nicknamed "Devil's Head" because of the illusion of a grinning demon behind the ear in the portrait of Elizabeth II
Onigawara, also known as "devil's head tiles", adornments for cornices in Japanese architecture
Sign of the horns, a hand gesture sometimes interpreted as a devil's head